George Buchanan (30 November 1890 – 28 June 1955) was a Scottish patternmaker, trade union activist and Member of Parliament.

Buchanan was born in Glasgow, Scotland. A committed socialist, he joined the Independent Labour Party (ILP).

Buchanan was vice-chairman of Glasgow Trades Council and sat on the City Council from 1919 to 1923. At the 1922 general election, he was elected to the House of Commons as the Member of Parliament (MP) for Glasgow Gorbals.

Buchanan supported Home Rule for Scotland and he was associated with the Scottish Home Rule Association. In 1924 he introduced a Scottish Home Rule Bill but despite support from Scottish MPs it was talked out by the Opposition.

In 1932, Buchanan became Chairman of the United Patternmakers Association of Great Britain, which he held for 16 years. He initially agreed with James Maxton's moving the ILP out of the mainstream Labour Party but decided to leave it to rejoin Labour in 1939.

At the 1945 general election, Buchanan retained the seat of Glasgow Gorbals and attained the largest increase in percentage of voters in recorded UK history. After the election, the new prime minister, Clement Attlee, appointed Buchanan as Under-Secretary of State for Scotland. Buchanan also later served as Minister of Pensions.

Buchanan resigned from Parliament in 1948 to take up the position of Chairman of the National Assistance Board and was succeeded by Alice Cullen, who had already succeeded him as the candidate for Glasgow Gorbals.

He died in 1955, at 64.

References

External links
 

1890 births
1955 deaths
Councillors in Glasgow
Gorbals
Independent Labour Party MPs
British trade union leaders
Members of the Parliament of the United Kingdom for Glasgow constituencies
Members of the Privy Council of the United Kingdom
Ministers in the Attlee governments, 1945–1951
Patternmakers (industrial)
Red Clydeside
Scottish Labour MPs
Scottish socialists
Scottish trade unionists
UK MPs 1922–1923
UK MPs 1923–1924
UK MPs 1924–1929
UK MPs 1929–1931
UK MPs 1931–1935
UK MPs 1935–1945
UK MPs 1945–1950
United Patternmakers' Association-sponsored MPs
Scottish republicans
Parliamentary Peace Aims Group